Dr.L.H.Hiranandani College of Pharmacy (DLHHCOP) is a Pharmacy College in the Mumbai suburban (Ulhasnagar) and affiliation to the  University of Mumbai. The College is under Sindhi Minority

Approvals and affiliations 
Approved by Pharmacy Council of India

Approved by DTE

Affiliated to University of Mumbai

Departments 
Department of Pharmaceutics

Department of Pharmaceutical chemistry 

Department of Quality Assurance

Department of Pharmacology

Department of Pharmacognosy

Unit of DLLE, Mumbai University 
College is  an active unit of DLLE, Mumbai University .

Sports
It has an area of 1994 sq ft, houses facilities for indoor games like Table tennis, Carrom, Chess, Gymnasium for workouts, Boxing, Weightlifting, and Judo. It has 2 playgrounds-one foreground and second on the rear side. It provides facilities like Handball, Volleyball, Basketball, Softball, Ball Badminton, Kabaddi, Kho Kho and Athletics.

NPTEL SWAYAM Local Chapter 
Dr L H Hiranandani College of Pharmacy is a recognised Local Chapter of NPTEL SWAYAM since 2019.

This local chapter is under IITM. Mr. Yogesh Chaudhari is SPOC for College ID 3114

See also
List of Mumbai Colleges

References

Educational institutions established in 1965
Universities and colleges in Mumbai
Ulhasnagar
1965 establishments in Maharashtra
Pharmacy colleges in Maharashtra